Erasmio is a community in the municipality Topeiros in the Xanthi regional unit of Greece. The community consists of the settlements Neo Erasmio, Dasochori and Palaio Erasmio.

Populated places in Xanthi (regional unit)